DeMarcus Omar Ware (born July 31, 1982) is an American former professional football player who was an outside linebacker in the National Football League (NFL). He played college football at Troy University and was drafted by the Dallas Cowboys with the 11th overall pick in the first round of the 2005 NFL Draft. After spending nine seasons with the Cowboys, Ware departed in 2013 as the franchise's all-time leader in quarterback sacks with 117. Ware then played three seasons for the Denver Broncos, with whom he won Super Bowl 50 over the Carolina Panthers. After the 2016 season with the Broncos, he announced his retirement from the NFL. In 2017, he signed a one-day contract with Dallas to retire as a Cowboy. In 2018, the Broncos hired Ware as a pass-rush consultant. In 2023, Ware was elected to the Pro Football Hall of Fame.

Early years
Ware was born on July 31, 1982, in Auburn, Alabama. Ware played football, basketball, baseball, and ran track in high school; he attended Auburn High School (with defensive end Osi Umenyiora and linebacker Marcus Washington). In football, Ware played both linebacker and wide receiver, and as a senior, he won every game, and was named the team's Most Valuable Wide Receiver and Most Valuable Linebacker, and won Top Leadership honors.  He finished his senior season with seven sacks and 55 total tackles (40 solo tackles, 15 assisted tackles).

In track & field, Ware was one of the state's top performers in the long jump (PB of 7.14 meters). He ran the 55 metres in 6.74 seconds and had a personal-best jump of 1.94 meters in the high jump.

College career
Ware accepted a scholarship from Troy University, where he was a two-time All-Sun Belt Conference selection for the Troy Trojans football team.

Ware became a starter at defensive end as a sophomore, and was a part of a defensive line that included future NFL player Osi Umenyiora. He posted 72 tackles (fifth on the team) and 19.5 tackles for loss. The next year, he registered 62 tackles, 16 tackles for a loss, six sacks, 32 quarterback hurries (led the team), five forced fumbles and two fumble recoveries.

As a senior, Ware was a dominant player, receiving the Sun Belt Defensive Player of the Year, and was a finalist for the Hendricks Award, which is given annually to the top defensive end in college football. In 2004, he helped lead his team to the school's first-ever bowl appearance, the Silicon Valley Football Classic. He posted 53 tackles, 10.5 sacks (led the Sun Belt Conference), 19 tackles for loss and four forced fumbles.

Ware finished his college career with 27.5 sacks, 201 tackles, 74 quarterback hurries, ten forced fumbles, four fumble recoveries, and one interception. His 27.5 sacks rank second in school history for sacks in a career, and his 55.5 tackles for losses rank first in school history.

Ware was named to the Sun Belt Conference All-Decade Team. In 2012, he was inducted into the Troy University Sports Hall of Fame. In 2014, he was inducted into the Senior Bowl Hall of Fame.

Professional career

2005 NFL Draft
A defensive end at Troy, Ware was considered a "tweener DE/OLB prospect" by most scouts. He was supposed to be a perfect fit as rush linebacker in 3-4 defense prior the 2005 NFL Draft and was projected to go early in the second round by Sports Illustrated. Prospect Marcus Spears was considered by head coach Bill Parcells to be the key to the team's eventual move to a 3-4 defense and wanted to take him with the first selection (11th overall pick). Owner/general manager Jerry Jones overruled Parcells and selected Ware instead with the 11th overall pick in the first round. The Cowboys thought would not be available later in the draft. Spears was selected by the Cowboys with the 20th overall pick.

Ware also was credited with a 430-pound bench press, a 570-pound squat, and a 360-pound power clean.

Dallas Cowboys

2005 season
In his NFL debut against the San Diego Chargers, Ware posted three tackles, one for a loss, and one quarterback pressure. The Cowboys won the game 28-24. In a game against San Francisco in Week 3, he recorded his first sack bringing down Tim Rattay. Ware earned the NFL Defensive Rookie of the Month award for October after recording 16 tackles, three sacks, and seven quarterback pressures to help Dallas start the season with a 3-2 record. In Week 16, Ware recorded three sacks and three forced fumbles in a match against the Carolina Panthers. For that performance, Ware was named NFC Defensive Player of the Week and the Diet Pepsi Rookie of the Week. He tied the Cowboys record for most sacks in a single game, held by Randy White. He finished with 58 total tackles, 14 tackles for losses and three forced fumbles. He tied Greg Ellis for a team-best eight sacks and joined Jimmie Jones as the only rookies to ever lead or tie for the Dallas Cowboys' team lead in sacks.

2006 season
In 2006, Ware ended the regular season with a team-high 11.5 sacks, the most ever by a Cowboys linebacker. This total broke Anthony Dickerson's record of 10.5 from 1983. He added 73 tackles, a fumble recovery, and an interception, both returned for a touchdown. Ware was named a starter on the NFC Pro Bowl team. In Week 6 against division rival Eagles, Ware had a memorable moment with his 69-yard fumble return for his first career NFL touchdown. He recorded his first career interception against Michael Vick in a game against the Atlanta Falcons and returned it for a 41-yard touchdown. Ware finished tied for ninth in the league in total sacks and Shawne Merriman led the league with 17 sacks.

2007 season
Ware broke out with his 2007 season, leading new Cowboys' head coach Wade Phillips to call him the best outside linebacker in the league.  Ware became the second Cowboy ever to record at least 14 sacks in a season, since Jim Jeffcoat in 1986. Ware led the team with 27 quarterback pressures, eight tackles for losses, and four forced fumbles while finishing with 80 tackles. Ware made his second straight Pro Bowl along with 12 other teammates. He was selected to the All-Pro team for the second straight year along with teammates, Terrell Owens and Jason Witten.  Ware finished tied for third in the league behind Patrick Kerney (14.5 sacks) and Jared Allen (15.5 sacks).

2008 season
In the 2008 matchup against the St. Louis Rams, Ware tied the NFL record of former Denver Broncos linebacker Simon Fletcher for recording a sack in ten straight games. He was named NFC Defensive Player of the Week for his Week 15 game against the New York Giants, where he had three sacks. Ware was selected to his third consecutive Pro Bowl after pacing the league, establishing an official club record and tying Derrick Thomas for sixth in league history with 20 sacks. Ware ended the 2008 season with 84 tackles, nine tackles for a loss, six forced fumbles, and two passes defended. Ware was named NFC Defensive Player of the Year by Kansas City Committee as well as NFL Alumni Pass Rusher of the Year. Ware finished the 2008 season as the league leader in sacks for the first time in his career. He finished second in AP Defensive Player of the Year voting. Ware became the first recipient of the professional Butkus Award.

2009 season
In 2009, Ware was listed as the best 3-4 outside linebacker by Sporting News In October, Ware signed a six-year, $78 million contract, putting him among the top-five highest paid defenders in the NFL. Two months later, Ware suffered a neck injury and was taken off the field by a cart while playing against the San Diego Chargers. The injury was diagnosed later as a sprained neck. He was taken to the hospital for further tests, but was released the next day.  He came back to play the next week, against the then-undefeated New Orleans Saints, and recorded two sack-fumbles, including the one that ended the Saints' chances at a comeback and an undefeated season. For this performance, he was named NFC Defensive Player of the Week. He made his fourth consecutive appearance in the Pro Bowl as a starter in 2009, after leading the Cowboys with 11.0 sacks, a career-high 45 pressures, and five forced fumbles. He was named to the First All-Pro team in recognition of his 2009 season.

2010 season
Ware earned NFC Defensive Player of the Week for his Week 3 game against the Houston Texans, where he had three sacks in the 27–13 victory. Ware recorded 15.5 sacks and led the NFL in that category for the second time in three seasons. He made a fifth straight Pro Bowl. By leading the NFL in sacks for the second time in his career, Ware tied the record for most seasons leading the league in sacks with two. He tied Mark Gastineau, 1983–84; Reggie White, 1987–88; Kevin Greene, 1994, 1996; Michael Strahan, 2001, 2003; and Jared Allen, 2007, 2011. He was ranked 12th by his fellow players on the NFL Top 100 Players of 2011.

2011 season
In 2011, Ware had 19.5 sacks, 47 tackles, two pass deflections, and two forced fumbles. On October 30, Ware recorded a career-high four sacks against the Philadelphia Eagles in a 34-7 loss. Ware finished second in the NFL in total sacks for the 2011 season behind Jared Allen who posted 22.0 sacks. Ware was selected to the 2012 Pro Bowl as a starter and voted to the All-Pro team again. He was ranked sixth by his fellow players on the NFL Top 100 Players of 2012.

2012 season
In the season opener against the defending Super Bowl champion New York Giants at MetLife Stadium, Ware recorded two sacks against Eli Manning to reach 101.5 sacks for his career. With these two sacks Ware became the second fastest player (113 games) to reach 100 sacks behind Reggie White (96 games). At the end of the 2012 season, Ware finished with 11.5 sacks, five forced fumbles and was selected to his seventh Pro Bowl and was named to the Second All-Pro team. Ware was unable to play in the Pro Bowl after his off-season shoulder surgery. He endured a difficult season having to deal with a hamstring he tore in training camp, a fractured right wrist and losing mobility on his right arm in the last three games, because of a hyperextended elbow and a torn labrum that forced him to use an elbow and shoulder harness. He was ranked 12th by his fellow players on the NFL Top 100 Players of 2013.

2013 season
Due to the Cowboys switch to the 4-3 from the 3-4, under new defensive coordinator Monte Kiffin, DeMarcus moved to defensive end, along with Anthony Spencer, who started his NFL career opposite Ware at left side linebacker, but was a defensive end at college. On the Cowboys's first play of the 2013 regular season, Ware recorded an interception off of Eli Manning in the 36–31 victory over the New York Giants.In Week 3 against the St. Louis Rams, he became the Cowboys' all-time sack leader, surpassing Harvey Martin's 30-year-old record of 114. He was ranked 56th by his fellow players on the NFL Top 100 Players of 2014.

After nine seasons with the Cowboys, Ware was released on March 11, 2014, making him a free agent for the first time in his career.

Denver Broncos

2014 season
On March 12, 2014, one day following his release from the Cowboys, Ware signed a three-year, $30 million contract with the Denver Broncos. The deal included $20 million in guaranteed money. Ware started at right outside linebacker for the team. He played 16 games, of which he started 15, finishing the season with 41 tackles, 10 sacks, one interception, one pass defensed, and two forced fumbles. He received Pro Bowl honors in his first season with the Broncos. He was ranked 87th by his fellow players on the NFL Top 100 Players of 2015.

2015 season
For the 2015 season, Ware was reunited with former head coach Wade Phillips as his defensive coordinator. The Broncos finished the season with the #1 defense and a 12-4 record. Ware posted 25 tackles and 7.5 sacks while playing in 11 of the regular season games, missing five games due to injury. In September, he earned AFC Defensive Player of the Month honors.

In the Divisional Round against the Pittsburgh Steelers, Ware had three tackles, recovered a crucial fumble near the end of the game, and recorded the game winning sack to help the Broncos win 23-16. Ware advanced to the Conference Championship for the first time in his career. In the AFC Championship game against the New England Patriots, Ware and the defense hit quarterback Tom Brady 27 times and placed pressure on him the entire game. The Broncos held on to win the game by a score of 20-18. On February 7, 2016, Ware was part of the Broncos team that won Super Bowl 50. In the game, the Broncos defeated the Carolina Panthers by a score of 24–10. Ware recorded five tackles and two sacks in the Super Bowl. He was ranked 36th by his fellow players on the NFL Top 100 Players of 2016.

2016 season
In a Week 1 Super Bowl 50 rematch against the Carolina Panthers, Ware recorded 1.5 sacks and helped the Broncos beat the Panthers by a score of 21-20. In Week 2 against the Colts, Ware left the game with an apparent arm injury as he was trying to bring down quarterback Andrew Luck. It was eventually revealed that there was an ulna fracture near the elbow. The injury required surgery with 4–5 weeks to recover. Ware went on to play 10 games recording four sacks before having season-ending back surgery on December 28, 2016.

Retirement
On March 13, 2017, Ware announced his retirement from the NFL after 12 seasons and 138.5 sacks, through his Twitter account.
 
On April 24, 2017, about a month after announcing his retirement from the NFL, Ware signed a one-day contract to retire as a member of the Dallas Cowboys, the team that drafted him.

Awards, recognitions and other statistics
Ware is tied for the record of most seasons leading the league in sacks with two (2008 and 2010).  Ware is tied with Mark Gastineau, 1983–84; Reggie White, 1987–88; Kevin Greene, 1994, 1996; Michael Strahan, 2001, 2003; Jared Allen, 2007, 2011; and J. J. Watt, 2012, 2015.

As of the end of the 2012 season, Ware recorded 10+ sacks in seven straight seasons.  Only two other players in NFL history have more consecutive seasons with 10+ sacks: Reggie White (9), John Randle (8)

Pete Prisco, CBS Sports Senior NFL Columnist, ranked Ware as the 3rd best player in the NFL (behind Aaron Rodgers and Tom Brady) going into the 2012 season and as the best defensive player in the NFL.  In 2012, NFL.com analyst Daniel Jeremiah ranked Ware as the best edge pass rusher in the league and a "top-five player in the NFL, regardless of position".  The NFL Top 100 for 2012 ranked Ware as the best rusher, best linebacker, 2nd overall defensive player behind defensive back Darrelle Revis (number 5 overall) and the 6th overall player in the NFL.

Ware is the second fastest player ever to reach 100 sacks.

Ware recorded 28 multiple-sack games and 32 forced fumbles as a member of the Dallas Cowboys, both most in club history.

Ware has ranked in the top three in total sacks league-wide in 4 out of 5 seasons (3rd place in 2007, 1st place in 2008, 7th place in 2009, 1st place in 2010, and 2nd place in 2011).

On April 19, 2016, the governor of Alabama declared April 19 "DeMarcus Ware Day" in his honor.

Pro Football Hall of Fame
On February 9, 2023, the Pro Football Hall of Fame announced that Ware would be inducted in its 2023 class, joining Joe Thomas, Darrelle Revis, Ronde Barber, and five others.

NFL career statistics

Regular season

Cowboys franchise records
All-time leader in sacks: 117
All-time leader in fumbles forced: 32
All-time leader in tackles for loss: 145
All-time leader in Quarterback hits: 185

Personal life
In March 2005, Ware married his high school sweetheart, Taniqua Smith, a former Air Force member and the daughter of a police officer. After three difficult pregnancies, including the birth and death of a son, Omar, in 2006, they adopted their daughter, Marley. In 2010, they had a son, DeMarcus Ware II. Ware and Smith divorced in 2012.

On September 12, 2018, Ware was announced as one of the celebrities who would compete on season 27 of Dancing with the Stars. His professional partner was Lindsay Arnold. Ware and Arnold were eliminated on the seventh week of competition, finishing in joint-seventh place alongside John Schneider and his professional partner Emma Slater.

References

External links

 

1982 births
Living people
Sportspeople from Auburn, Alabama
Auburn High School (Alabama) alumni
American football defensive ends
American football linebackers
Troy Trojans football players
Dallas Cowboys players
Denver Broncos players
National Conference Pro Bowl players
Unconferenced Pro Bowl players
People from Colleyville, Texas
Players of American football from Alabama
100 Sacks Club